Deborah Loewenberg Ball is an educational researcher noted for her work in mathematics instruction and the mathematical preparation of teachers. From 2017 to 2018 she serves as president of the American Educational Research Association. She served as dean of the School of Education at the University of Michigan from 2005 to 2016, and she currently works as William H. Payne Collegiate Professor of education. Ball directs TeachingWorks, a major project at the University of Michigan to redesign the way that teachers are prepared for practice, and to build materials and tools that will serve the field of teacher education broadly. In a sometimes divisive field,
Ball has a reputation of being respected by both mathematicians and educators. She is also an extremely well respected mentor to junior faculty members and to graduate students.

Education
As an undergraduate at Michigan State University, Ball majored in French and then taught elementary school for seventeen years in East Lansing, Michigan. Ball only started serious study of mathematics when she saw her students struggling in math. In 1988 she received her Ph.D. from Michigan State University from the department of teacher education. Her thesis was titled Knowledge and reasoning in mathematical pedagogy: Examining what prospective teachers bring to teacher education.

Research
Ball's research focuses on improving the effectiveness and quality of mathematical instruction. Much of her work investigates the mathematical knowledge needed for teaching, and she was among the first to suggest that this knowledge is qualitatively different from what is taught in advanced mathematics classes.

Awards and Positions
In 2004, Ball and coauthors David K. Cohen and Stephen W. Raudenbush won the Palmer O. Johnson Award presented by the American Educational Research Association for the best article published in an AERA journal in 2003 for their paper Resources, instruction, and research. In 2007, she was elected member of the National Academy of Education (NAEd). In 2008, she won the Outstanding Contributions to Mathematics Education Award, presented by the Michigan Council of Teachers of Mathematics. In 2009, she won the 19th Louise Hay Award for Outstanding Contributions to Mathematics Education, presented by the Association for Women in Mathematics. In 2012 she became a fellow of the American Mathematical Society.

In 1999, Ball was appointed by U.S. Secretary of Education Richard Riley to serve on the National Commission on Mathematics and Science Teaching for the 21st Century, a committee chaired by Senator John Glenn. From 1999 to 2003, Ball served as chair of the RAND Mathematics Study Panel, whose work culminated in the publication Mathematical Proficiency for All Students: Toward a Strategic Research and Development Program in Mathematics Education. In 2003, Ball was appointed to the board of trustees of the Mathematical Sciences Research Institute, and serves as the chair of the Education Committee there. In 2006, Ball was appointed by U.S. Secretary of Education Margaret Spellings to the National Mathematics Advisory Panel.

Family
Deborah is married to Richard and has 3 children. Daughter, Sarah, and sons, Joshua and Jacob.

References

External links
 Deborah Ball's website

Living people
University of Michigan faculty
American educational theorists
Fellows of the American Mathematical Society
American women mathematicians
21st-century women mathematicians
Year of birth missing (living people)
20th-century American educators
Mathematicians from Michigan
21st-century American mathematicians
20th-century American women educators
Schoolteachers from Michigan
21st-century American women